Eagle Mountain is the highest natural point in Minnesota, United States, at . It is in northern Cook County in the Boundary Waters Canoe Area Wilderness and Superior National Forest in the Misquah Hills, northwest of Grand Marais. It is a Minnesota State Historic Site.

It is part of the Canadian Shield. Confusingly, there is another much shorter peak also named Eagle Mountain in northern Minnesota. The shorter peak is part of the Lutsen Mountains ski resort.

Access
The hike to the summit can be made in about two and a half hours. The trail is rocky and moderately strenuous. Whale Lake is about halfway along the trail and offers two campsites to hikers. The peak of the mountain is marked with a plaque.

Permits are required because portions of this hike enter the Boundary Waters Canoe Area Wilderness. Self-issued permits are available at any Superior National Forest ranger station or at the trailhead. Instructions and the permit can usually be found at the trailhead kiosk.

Among the highest natural points (highpoints) in each U.S. state, Eagle Mountain ranks 37th.

See also
 
 
 
 List of mountains of Minnesota
 List of U.S. states by elevation

References

External links

 Eagle Mt/Brule Lake, U.S. Forest Service.  Map and access information.
 
 

Highest points of U.S. states
Hiking trails in Minnesota
Mountains of Minnesota
Protected areas of Cook County, Minnesota
Superior National Forest
Mountains of Cook County, Minnesota